Cornis or Corniș may refer to:
 Corniș River, a Romanian river, tributary of the Moravița
 , a racing car constructor which attempted to qualify for the 1959 Indianapolis 500

See also 
 Cornice, an architectural element